The 2010–11 Indiana Hoosiers men's basketball team represented Indiana University in the 2010–11 college basketball season. Their head coach was Tom Crean, in his third season with the Hoosiers. The team played its home games at the Assembly Hall in Bloomington, Indiana, and was a member of the Big Ten Conference. They finished the season 12–20, 3–15 in Big Ten play to finish in 11th place and lost in the first round of the Big Ten tournament to Penn State.

2010–11 Roster

Recruiting class

Schedule and results

|-
!colspan=9| Exhibition
|-

|-
!colspan=9| Regular Season
|-

|-
!colspan=9| Big Ten tournament

References

Indiana Hoosiers
Indiana Hoosiers men's basketball seasons
2010 in sports in Indiana
2011 in sports in Indiana